Afra Mall  is a shopping mall in Khartoum, Sudan. It opened in 2004 and is the first shopping mall in the country. 

It contains a hypermarket, a movie theater, an ice-skating rink, an internet cafe, a food court, currency exchanges, and a variety of shops. 

A substantial portion of the shopping center burned in early May 2012; the mall was subsequently renovated.

References

Shopping malls in Sudan
Buildings and structures completed in 2004
Buildings and structures in Khartoum
Shopping malls established in 2004